Themisto is a genus of marine amphipods in the family Hyperiidae. Their distribution is cosmopolitan.

Ecological role
Themisto are obligate carnivores. Themisto gaudichaudii has been found to feed opportunistically on copepods and chaetognaths, as juveniles also on diatoms.

Themisto are important prey in many food webs. For example, Themisto gaudichaudii reaches high densities (up to 61 individuals/m3) in Kerguelen waters and is a major food item for blue petrels, thin-billed prions, Antarctic prions, common diving petrels, and southern rockhopper penguins. In the Barents Sea, Themisto libellula is very abundant in the Arctic waters and important food item for cod, polar cod, and marine mammals near the ice edge, whereas Themisto abyssorum is important in Atlantic/boreal waters.

Life history
Reproduction can be nearly continuous but becomes more seasonal at higher latitudes.

Species
There are seven recognized species:
 Themisto abyssorum (Boeck, 1870)
 Themisto australis (Stebbing, 1888)
 Themisto compressa Goës, 1865
 Themisto gaudichaudii Guérin, 1825
 Themisto japonica (Bovallius, 1887)
 Themisto libellula (Lichtenstein in Mandt, 1822)
 Themisto pacifica (Stebbing, 1888)

References

Hyperiidea
Crustacean genera
Taxa named by Félix Édouard Guérin-Méneville